Andreas Barucha (born 2 April 1979 in Potsdam) is a German bobsledder who has competed since 1999. He won a gold in the mixed team event at the 2009 FIBT World Championships in Lake Placid, New York. His best finish at the FIBT World Championships was seventh in the four-man event at Calgary in 2005.

Barucha's best World Cup finish was second three times in the four-man event (2005, 2006, 2009).

He finished fourth in the four-man event at the 2010 Winter Olympics in Vancouver.

References

1979 births
Living people
Sportspeople from Potsdam
German male bobsledders
Bobsledders at the 2010 Winter Olympics
Olympic bobsledders of Germany